Charles Michael Futrell, known as Mike Futrell (born July 20, 1960), is the city manager for Riverside, California. He is an attorney, a retired United States Navy officer, and a former member of the Louisiana House of Representatives.

Education
Born in Baton Rouge, Louisiana, Futrell graduated from Baton Rouge High School in 1978. In 1982, he received a Bachelor of Business and Public Administration from Louisiana State University. He then received a Juris Doctor degree from LSU Paul M. Hebert Law Center and a Master of Business Administration (MBA) from the University of Massachusetts Amherst. Futrell is a graduate of the Air Command and Staff College at Maxwell Air Force Base, in Montgomery, Alabama.

Navy career
From 1987 to 1993, Futrell served two tours of duty as an officer on nuclear submarines. On the submarine USS Ulysses S. Grant (SSBN-631), near the end of the Cold War, Futrell came in constant contact with submarines of the former Soviet Union.  Futrell also served on the commissioning crew of the submarine USS Kentucky (SSBN 737) operating out of Naval Submarine Base Kings Bay in Georgia.
In 2006, Futrell was recalled to active duty for twelve months during the Iraq War. For that service, Futrell was awarded the Bronze Star. Futrell was assigned as the officer in charge of DRMS operations in Iraq, leading installations at four U.S. bases in Iraq.
In 2010, Futrell was again recalled to active military duty, this time on staff at U.S. Pacific Command in Hawaii, as a Navy Captain (United States O-6), where he was the director of the Commander's Action Group (CAG), under the commander of U.S. Pacific Command, Admiral Robert F. Willard. He also led a crisis action team responding to the earthquake/tsunami/nuclear disaster in Japan code named Operation Tomodachi. At the end of his one-year tour of duty, Futrell stayed in Hawaii as executive vice president of Hawaii Gas, the natural gas utility servicing the major Hawaiian Islands.

Public Service
In 1996 Futrell was elected to the City of Baton Rouge/Parish of East Baton Rouge Metropolitan Council, succeeding the incumbent Republican. In 1999 Futrell was elected to the Louisiana House of Representatives where he served on the Transportation Committee, House and Governmental Affairs Committee and the Local and Municipal Affairs Committee. Futrell was re-elected to the Louisiana House of Representatives in 2003.

In 2005 Futrell left the House of Representatives to join the staff of newly elected United States Senator David Vitter as State Director, responsible for all operations throughout Louisiana and principle state liaison to the Senator's Washington D.C. Office. In 2008, Futrell left Vitter's office to work for the City of Baton Rouge under then Mayor-President Kip Holden as the assistant chief administrative officer. Walter Monsour, under whom Futrell served, said that Futrell earned his trust through the handling of the $1.2 billion municipal sewer program. In 2009, upon Monsour's retirement, Futrell was elevated to chief administrative officer by Holden.

In 2014, Futrell became the City Manager for South San Francisco. He reorganized the city staff, hiring a number of new managers.

References

1960 births
Living people
People from South San Francisco, California
Baton Rouge Magnet High School alumni
Louisiana State University alumni
Louisiana State University Law Center alumni
Republican Party members of the Louisiana House of Representatives
Politicians from Baton Rouge, Louisiana
Louisiana lawyers
Louisiana city council members
United States Navy officers
Military personnel from Louisiana